P. J. Antony (1 January 1925 – 14 March 1979) was an Indian stage and film actor. He received the National Film Award for Best Actor for his performance in Nirmalyam in 1974. He was also the first actor working in Malayalam cinema to receive the award. Antony was also a respected figure in the professional theatre field, working with communist cultural and art bodies like the K.P.A.C.

He also established his own theater, named Prathibha Theatres, in Kochi.

Biography
In his early 20s, Antony served in the Royal Navy during World War II. Post war, he returned home and joined a workshop as an officer. It was in this period that Antony got chance to work with professional theatre artists. Soon he established himself as a prominent figure in Malayalam plays with his skills in acting, writing and direction. He was directly associated with the K.P.A.C., a major political drama theater at that time. He later established two theaters of his own, namely P. J. Theatres and Prathibha Theatres (which is still active).

Building on his expertise in stage plays, Antony began his film acting career. His debut film was Randidangazhi (1957), a film adaptation of Thakazhi Sivasankara Pillai's novel of the same title. He won the National Film Award for Best Actor (known then, in 1974, as the Bharath Award) for his performance as a velichappadu (an oracle or medium between the Goddess and the worshipper in a Hindu temple) in Nirmalyam, directed by prominent literary figure M. T. Vasudevan Nair. Antony was the lyricist and screenwriter for a small number of films. He also directed a film titled Periyar.

In a historical drama, Amal Neerad's Iyobinte Pusthakam had the famous director Aashiq Abu playing the role of P. J. Antony, though in a guest appearance.

Awards
National Film Awards:

Best Actor - 1974 - Nirmalyam

Kerala State Film Awards:

Best Actor - 1973 - Nirmalyam

Filmfare Awards South:

Best Actor - 1974 - Nirmalyam

Filmography

Acting

Manninte Maril (1979)
Choola (1979)
Padasaram (1978) as Pulluvan
 Nurayum Pathayum(1977)
 Odakuzhal(1975)
Athithi (1975)
Nirmalayam (1973) as Velichapad
Periyar (1973)
 Dharmayudham(1973) as Naanu
Ragging (1973)
Manushyabandhaal (1972)
Jalakanyaka (1971)
Moodalmanju (1970)
Pearl View (1970) as Xavier
Crossbelt (1970) as Sekhara Panikkar
 Kakkathamburatti(1970)
Kurukshethram (1970)
Dathuputhran (1970) as Maanichan
Nadhi (1969) as Mullakkal Varkey
Kattukuranu (1969)
Virunnukari (1969) as Raghava Menon
Veettumriam (1969)
Asuravithu (1968) as Kunjarikkar
Lakshaprabhu (1968)
 Kayalkkarayil(1968)
Punnapra Vayalar(1968) as Kochu Naanu
Manaswini (1968)
Chekkuthante Kotta (1967)
Naarame Nandi (1967)
Mulkireedam (1967)
Pareeksha (1967) as Neelakanda Pilla
Kamuki (1967)
Iruttinte Athmavu (1967) as Gopalan Nair
 Sheelavathi(1967)
Kavalam Chundan (1967)
Anveshichu Kandethiyilla (1967)
Aswametham (1967) as Keshavan Swamy
Balyakalasakhi (1967)
Tharavattamma (1966) as Govinda Pilla
Kunjali Marakkar (1966) as Zamorin's Nephew
Murappennu (1965) as Kunjikrishana Menon
Rosy(1965) as (Hero)
Bhargavi Nilayam (1964) as Narayanan Nair (Nanukuttan)
Thacholi Othenan (1964) as Kathiroor Gurukkal
Adyakiranagal (1964) as Kariyachan
Ore Bhoomi Ore Raktham (1964)
Oral Koodi Kallanayi (1964)
Kalaju Kittiya Thankam (1964) as Kuttan Nair
Ammaye Kaanaan (1963) as Sukumaran Nair
Ninamanija Kalpadukal (1963) as Thankamma's husband
Kalpadukal (1962)
Mudiyanaya Puthran (1961) as Vasu
Randidangazhi (1958)
Bheeshma Parvam (2022) as Paily Anjoottikkaran (Paily Chettayi) (deceased) (photo presence)

Director
Periyar (1973)

Screenwriter
Sheelavathi (1968)
 C.I.D. Nazir (1971)
 Rosie (1965)

Literary works
P. J. Antony has authored 30 short stories, 100 songs, 41 dramas, 2 autobiographies.

Short stories
Pukachurulukal
Kalakavan
Naludivasangal
Ennayillaatha vilakku
Chilampoli
Thakarnna veena
Aa moksham ningalkku venda

Novels
Itha manushyan
Orugramathinte Athmavu

Poems
Prabhatha geetham

Song collections
Onappattukal
Thakarnna veena
Prema sangheetham
Keralam Unarunnu

Memories
Ente nadaka smaranakal
Natakame Ulakam

References

External links
PJ Antony at MSI

Best Actor National Film Award winners
Indian male film actors
Male actors from Kochi
1925 births
Kerala State Film Award winners
1979 deaths
Male actors in Malayalam cinema
Filmfare Awards South winners
Indian male dramatists and playwrights
Indian male stage actors
Malayalam film directors
20th-century Indian male actors
20th-century Indian dramatists and playwrights
20th-century Indian film directors
Writers from Kochi
Male actors in Malayalam theatre
Film directors from Kochi
20th-century Indian short story writers
20th-century Indian novelists
20th-century Indian poets
Poets from Kerala
Indian lyricists
Indian memoirists
Malayalam screenwriters
Military personnel from Kerala
Screenwriters from Kochi
Novelists from Kerala
20th-century Indian male writers
20th-century Indian screenwriters
20th-century memoirists